Abdul Ghani Ghani is representative from Balkh Province to the Meshrano Jirga, the upper house of Afghanistan's national legislature.
He was selected to sit in the upper house by the Balkh Provincial Council elected in 2005.

See also
Politics of Afghanistan

References 

Afghan politicians
Living people
Year of birth missing (living people)